The University of Maryland, Baltimore County (UMBC) is a public research university in Baltimore County, Maryland. It has a fall 2022 enrollment of 13,991 students, 61 undergraduate majors, over 92 graduate programs (38 master, 25 doctoral, and 29 graduate certificate programs) and the first university research park in Maryland. It is classified among "R1: Doctoral Universities – Very High Research Activity".

Established as a part of the University System of Maryland in 1966, the university became the first public college or university in Maryland to be inclusive of all races. UMBC has the fourth highest enrollment of the University System of Maryland, specializing in natural sciences and engineering, as well as programs in the liberal arts and social sciences.  Athletically, the UMBC Retrievers have 17 NCAA Division I teams that participate in the America East Conference.

History

The planning of the University of Maryland, Baltimore County was first discussed in the 1950s due to the post-World War II baby boom, the expansion of higher education under the GI Bill, and the large amount of growth both in population and industry in the Baltimore-Washington Metropolitan Area. At this time, the University of Maryland, College Park was the main higher education source in the region, so talks began of adding a branch campus in the Baltimore area. In 1955, Governor Theodore McKeldin issued "The Needs of Higher Education in Maryland," which recommended the need for university expansion. Three years later, the "Advisory Committee on Higher Education in the State of Maryland" report proposed that the Baltimore branch of the University of Maryland be established as a two-year program, subordinate to the College Park campus. In 1960, the Warfield Commission, appointed by Governor Tawes, issued, "A Plan for Expanding the University of Maryland," which propelled the idea of creating three additional university centers throughout Maryland.

In 1963, the Maryland Legislature approved the development of several new universities throughout Maryland. By the end of that year, 435 acres were purchased from Spring Grove State Hospital, a psychiatric facility in Catonsville, Maryland. The new campus would be efficiently located in Southwestern Baltimore, and would be able to be accessed from Wilkens Avenue, the Baltimore Beltway and Interstate 95. Architectural design and planning of the new campus was completed at the University of Maryland, College Park. In 1965, Albin Owings Kuhn, an accomplished administrator and professor at College Park was named Vice President of Baltimore Campuses, including both UMBC and the founding campus, University of Maryland, Baltimore. The new campus also included Dr. Homer Schamp of the College Park as the first dean of faculty, David Lewis as the first full-time faculty member and head of Social Sciences, and John Haskell, Jr. as the first librarian.

The first classes began on September 19, 1966 with 750 students, 3 buildings, and the older wing of the Biological Sciences building, 45 faculty members, 35 support staff, and 500 parking spaces.  As university enrollment increased drastically over the coming years, the university would also coincide with the turbulent changes in society in the 1960s. While undergoing the Civil rights movement and the Vietnam War, UMBC would prove to be a new and different atmosphere with open and peaceful minds during campus protests. In 1971, Albin Owings Kuhn resigned his position as UMBC's first chancellor, succeeded by Calvin B. T. Lee. Five years later in 1976, John Dorsey, administrative vice president at the University of Maryland, College Park was appointed as UMBC's third chancellor.

By 1980, undergraduate enrollment reached 5,800 students. Also in this year, Homecoming and Quadmania were established as cornerstone events that would become UMBC tradition for years to come. During this decade, the University Center and Sherman Hall were opened, as well as Hillside and Terrace Apartments. In addition, University of Maryland, College Park alum Jim Henson funded the establishment of the Imaging Research Center at UMBC. In 1986, Michael Hooker became chancellor, a post he held until 1992, when he was appointed president of the University of Massachusetts system. In 1988, a proposed merger of UMBC with the University of Baltimore was considered but was voted down by the University System of Maryland Board of Regents.

In 1990, undergraduate enrollment reached over 10,000 students. In 1991, a merger plan between UMBC and the University of Maryland, Baltimore was approved in the Maryland House of Delegates, but was rejected by the Senate. Throughout the last decade of the 20th century, the university opened the Engineering and Computer Science Building and Potomac Hall. UMBC's longest-serving president, Freeman A. Hrabowski III, was appointed in 1992. He retired in 2022 and was succeeded by Valerie Sheares Ashby that summer.

The first decade of the 21st century featured many university developments as UMBC approached its 40th anniversary in 2006. Some of these developments included the establishment of the Center for Urban Environmental Research and Education, a new partnership with the NASA Goddard Space Flight Center to develop the Goddard Earth Science and Technology (GEST) Center, as well as numerous expansions to the campus such as The Commons, the Physics Building, Information Technology & Engineering Building and the Public Policy Building. During this time, UMBC was recognized by the American Society for Biochemistry and Molecular Biology (ASBMB) for being the leading producers of chemistry and biochemistry degrees, and was classified by The Carnegie Foundation as being among the top tier research universities, Doctoral/Research Universities for achieving 50 or more doctoral degrees per year across at least 15 disciplines.

Academics and research

UMBC offers undergraduate and graduate degree programs in a variety of areas of study. There are 61 majors in 55 distinct programs, 70 minors, and 36 certificate programs offered in its undergraduate program. UMBC's Graduate School offers 38 master's degree programs, 25 doctoral degree programs, and 29 graduate certificate programs. The university is divided into three colleges, three schools, as well as its graduate school.

Colleges
 The UMBC College of Natural and Mathematical Sciences includes the Departments of Biological Sciences, Chemistry and Biochemistry, Marine Biotechnology, Mathematics and Statistics, Naval Science, and Physics.
 The UMBC College of Engineering and Information Technology offers different areas of study in five departments: the Departments of Chemical, Biochemical & Environmental Engineering, Computer Science and Electrical Engineering, Information Systems, and Mechanical Engineering.
 The UMBC College of Arts, Humanities and Social Sciences houses the most departments in the university and awards more than half of all undergraduate and graduate degrees. Among many others, it includes the departments of Ancient Studies, History, Dance, Music, Education, Political Science, Psychology, Media and Communication studies, and Visual Arts. Many of the departments are now housed in the new Performing Arts and Humanities Building. The Media and Communications studies department is housed on the second floor of Sherman Hall, in the A-wing. Groundbreaking and a grand opening ceremony for the Performing Arts building was held on September 19, 2012. Another grand opening ceremony was held to officially open both phases of the building on October 17, 2014.

Schools
 The UMBC Erickson School of Aging Studies  offers undergraduate and graduate level programs that focuses on various aspects of aging studies, including policy and management issues.
 The University of Maryland Graduate School, Baltimore (UMGSB) represents the combined graduate and research programs at UMBC and the University of Maryland, Baltimore (UMB).
 The UMBC School of Public Policy includes the public policy programs for the masters and doctorate degrees.
 The University of Maryland, Baltimore School of Social Work links with UMBC in offering graduate and undergraduate level social work programs, respectively.

Extension
UMBC Training Centers provide technical and professional training programs remotely and directly at UMBC's South Campus in Arbutus, the Columbia Gateway Campus in nearby Columbia, Maryland, and cybersecurity education in Augusta, Georgia.

Research and Creative Achievement

UMBC is among the fastest-growing research universities in the country and is classified as a Doctoral University with Very High Research Activity by the Carnegie Foundation. The university consistently ranks among the top 100 public U.S. institutions in federal research and development expenditures. UMBC's research themes focus on environmental sciences, especially atmospheric physics and remote sensing, Earth and space sciences, and ecology and remediation; on health and life sciences, including marine biotechnology and bio sciences and engineering; on data sciences and national security, with special focus on cybersecurity and artificial intelligence, cognitive computing, health IT, and big data analytics; on health equity and policy studies, and on public humanities and the arts.

The university is ranked among the top 15 U.S. universities in NASA funding. UMBC's NASA-funded centers at NASA Goddard include the Joint Center for Earth Systems Technology (JCET), the Goddard Planetary Heliophysics Institute (GPHI), and the Center for Space Sciences and Technology (CSST). In April 2021, CSST received an additional $54 million in funding from NASA Goddard for astrophysics research.

Faculty at UMBC have been recognized with 40 National Science Foundation CAREER Awards since 1995, including nine since 2017. Two UMBC researchers have received the Presidential Early Career Award in Science and Engineering (PECASE) — one from NSF in 2005 and one from NSA in 2014. UMBC also has one of only two Howard Hughes Medical Institute investigators at a public university in Maryland, a National Academy of Sciences member, as well as a DARPA Young Faculty Award winner, and NASA's 2012 Distinguished Public Service Medal recipient. UMBC faculty regularly receive Fulbright and Guggenheim fellowship.

bwtech@UMBC, UMBC's incubator and research park, houses more than 130 companies and three incubators in cybersecurity, life sciences, and clean technology. UMBC has more than 20 campus-wide centers and institutes, including three Collaborative Centers with NASA Goddard (JCET, GPHI, and CSST), the Center for Advanced Real-Time Analytics (CARTA), the Center for Advanced Sensor Technology (CAST), the Center for Urban Environmental Research and Education (CUERE), the Earth and Space Institute (ESI), The Hilltop Institute, the Center for Social Science Scholarship (CS3), the Center for Art, Design & Visual Culture (CADVC), the Dresher Center, and the Imaging Research Center (IRC)

Campus

History

In 1840, the state of Maryland purchased the land that the university is located on today. At that time, it was known as the Stabler Estate, owned by the prominent Stabler family of Baltimore County. James P. Stabler, the chief engineer and superintendent of the Baltimore and Ohio Railroad was connected to the estate. The Baltimore Trade School, an orphan's home located on present day Giffen Hill, was established in that same year. The school continued to operate and farm the surrounding acreage up until World War II. The state later added the property to Spring Grove State Hospital, who farmed the land until the university's establishment. A few of the original structures were still in use by UMBC for some time, including the Hillcrest Building and a farmhouse. Located off of Walker Avenue, the Hillcrest Building was originally built in 1921 to house patients of Spring Grove State Hospital. The building was historically significant for it was the "first building constructed specifically for the care and treatment of mentally ill prisoners to be built at a state psychiatric hospital anywhere in the United States". In 1965, the structure was used as UMBC's administration building, and later used as the office of residential life and a student union. A common campus urban legend claims that the man that Hannibal Lecter was based on lived in a basement cell of the building. Hillcrest was demolished in 2007 due to toxicity concerns, leaving the farm silo on UMBC Boulevard to be oldest surviving structure on the university's campus.

Opened for enrollment in 1966, UMBC was created to serve the overflow of students from the Baltimore area seeking admission to University of Maryland, College Park. From its beginning, the new commuter campus faced a surfeit of problems. Sited on free land taken from a state hospital, the campus was not sponsored or protected by any political constituency. There were already nine other campuses in the metropolitan area. Located a few miles from the University of Maryland, Baltimore campus, there was no chance UMBC could develop the array of professional schools common to research universities. Its County name, an afterthought, was more consistent with two-year schools than a Ph.D. - granting institution. Yet as UMBC continues past its 50th anniversary, it has become a national role model for new American universities. The book Improbable Excellence: the Saga Of UMBC chronicles this development.

Landscape

UMBC's main entrance is approached from Metropolitan Boulevard where there is a UMBC Campus exit that leads to UMBC Boulevard. Soon after the campus exit, UMBC Boulevard intersects Research Park Drive which leads into UMBC's Research & Technology Park. UMBC's campus is also served by Wilkens Avenue, which provides access to the Baltimore Beltway and Rolling Road. Entrances off of Wilkens Avenue include Hilltop Road and Walker Avenue. Hilltop Road leads towards Catonsville's Business District on Frederick Road and Spring Grove Hospital Center. On the other side of the campus, Poplar Avenue gives direct access to Arbutus's Business District on East Drive. The campus core is served by Hilltop Circle, which creates a complete circle encompassing the campus.

Academic Row is known to be the central pedestrian concourse and maintenance vehicle highway in the campus that borders along a series of buildings. Beginning south at Administration Drive, the pathway is covered by mature trees on either side. Friendly squirrels are a common sight near the University Center where students tend to feed them waffle fries from Chick-fil-A. Academic Row is bordered by the Administration Building, the Retriever Activities Center, Janet and Walter Sondheim Hall, Sherman Hall (Previously named Academic IV), University Center, Math and Psychology Building, Biological Sciences Building, and the Meyerhoff Chemistry Building. At the northern end, the walkway is intersected by Schwartz Breezeway leading to the Commons, the university's student union. Academic Row terminates at the Albin O. Kuhn Library & Gallery, where multiple paths radiate across Erickson Field towards the Commons, the Physics and Public Policy Buildings, West Hills, Hillside, and Terrace Apartments, as well as additional dormitories.

Taking any of the tree-lined staircases to the next level of campus leads to the ITE, Engineering, and Fine Arts buildings, all of which can also be accessed though shortcuts from any of the multitude of buildings on Academic Row. As of 2015, the new Performing Arts and Humanities building has also been servicing students, which is another short walk up from the Engineering building. New lots have also been constructed outside of the Performing Arts and Humanities building in order to accommodate more commuter students and faculty. Fall of 2015 brings with it two new roundabouts that have been made at the intersection of Administration Drive and Research Park Drive and between Research Park Drive and the entrance ramp on to I-95.

On the southern side of the Commons, a large grassy area known as the Quad is where many student events and activities take place throughout the school year. Another area of student congregation is at UC Plaza in front of the University Center. The University Center houses multiple dining options, the UC Ballroom, as well as additional university event and teaching space.

Gallery

Location

UMBC's campus is located on 500 acres. It is approximately 15 minutes from Baltimore's Inner Harbor and 60 minutes from Washington, D.C. Baltimore-Washington International Airport is five minutes away, as well as Amtrak and Baltimore Light Rail stations (BWI Airport and BWI Business District). In addition, the MARC Penn Line serves the UMBC population at Halethorpe Station, which is located approximately two miles away on Southwestern Boulevard in Arbutus, Maryland. The Halethorpe/Satellite bus transit line transports students to and from the train station. UMBC, three miles outside the Baltimore city limits, successfully lobbied the government to use 'Baltimore' as its address. While its suburban campus has minimal interaction with its surroundings, students variously consider it to be located in the towns of Catonsville (by CDP) or Arbutus (whose street grid it borders). The campus is undercut by a series of tunnels.

Originally UMBC was supposed to be located in Baltimore City. However, due to many disputes the university is located in the neighborhood of Southern Catonsville, 1.5 miles south of Catonsville's Central Business District along Frederick Road. Catonsville provides a college town atmosphere for UMBC by having numerous restaurants, bars, and other conveniences. The town also provides festivals and farmers' markets every Sunday from May to November.

Research and Technology Park

UMBC Research and Technology Park is a 71-acre development on the campus hosting technology, bioscience and research organizations, many of which are engaged in partnership with the university. The research park, split into two campuses, is the oldest university research park in Maryland. The North Campus focuses primarily on cybersecurity, and includes the Cyber Incubator and a new addition of the CyberHive. The South Campus is a life-science and business incubator, and has graduated over 50 companies through its program. Research Park tenants include the US Geological Survey, US Forestry Service, CardioMed Device Consultants, Audacious Inquiry, Med-IQ, Physician Practice, Inc., Retirement Living TV, Ascentium Corporation, Solvern Innovations, RMF Engineering, Inc., Convergent Technology, Clear Resolution Consulting, Fearless Solutions, Potomac Photonics, and Next Breath.

Transportation

UMBC has several bus shuttle lines that are available to UMBC's students, faculty, and staff. All but the Wave 'n Ride are free by showing of one's campus identification card. The Wave ‘n Ride was historically available to anyone who needs intracampus transport around Hilltop Circle and UMBC Boulevard, but the service is pending decommission.

In August 2014, service has expanded to two new lines connect the campus to downtown Baltimore. These two lines (Downtown A-B Lines) also connect the campus to the Baltimore Metro Subway by way of Lexington Market Station. The Downtown B Line connects to the Metro as well as MARC Train at Camden Station, and the Baltimore Light Rail by way of Convention Center Station.

The Maryland Transit Administration offers additional service to the UMBC community. Bus lines 35, 77, and 95 offer service to the campus. The MARC Train provides Penn Line rail service two miles from the campus at Halethorpe station, connecting the university to Baltimore and Washington.

The UMBC campus is home to a number of trails for pedestrians and bicyclists as well. Some of these pathways include a walking bridge and path that connects the central campus to the Research Park to the south, as well as an unpaved path from UMBC Boulevard to Selford Road that is frequented by runners and joggers. Nearby, the Short Line Railroad Trail can be accessed through Hilltop Road and Spring Grove Hospital Center. The rail trail provides paved pathway access from downtown Catonsville and Paradise, crossing the Baltimore Beltway. Additionally, cyclists have on-road bike routes from the campus to Halethorpe station via downtown Arbutus.

Campus police
UMBC maintains a 24-hour police staff of sworn officers, supplemented by non-sworn security officers and student marshals. Like the campus police of the University of Maryland, College Park and the University of Maryland, Baltimore, the campus police are accredited by the Commission on Accreditation for Law Enforcement Agencies.  Accreditation is expected by the University System of Maryland mandated 2013 deadline. The UMBC police logs all crime reports and statistics as required by law on the UMBC Police Webpage.

President

In May 1992, Freeman A. Hrabowski III began his term as president of the University of Maryland, Baltimore County. He was named by TIME Magazine as one of the "100 Most Influential People in the World", and for his work with UMBC was honored as America's Top 10 College Presidents in 2009. Under his leadership, UMBC has been ranked the #1 Up and Coming University in the US for six consecutive years (2009, 2010, 2011, 2012, 2013, and 2014) by U.S. News & World Report magazine. His research and publications are more focused on science and math education, with particular emphasis on minority participation and performance.

On August 1, 2022, following Hrabowski's retirement, Valerie Sheares Ashby became president of the university, becoming its first female president.

Financial aid and scholarships

The Meyerhoff Scholarship Program at UMBC is a program focused on the cultivation of underrepresented minority scholarship and awareness in the math, science, and engineering disciplines. Other scholarship programs include the CWIT Scholars Program, the Humanities Scholars Program, the Dresher Humanities Fellowships, Honors College Fellowships, the Linehan Artist Scholars Program, the Sondheim Public Affairs Scholars Program and the Sherman Teacher Education Scholars Program. Students can also receive scholarships through the athletic department, after being recruited to play on a sports team at UMBC.  The Linehan Artist Scholars Program is a four-year scholarship program for incoming freshmen with a major in the arts, including dance, music, performing arts, visual arts, and theater. The artists learn to work together and collaborate on projects, under the direction of Doug Hamby.

UMBC's Grand Challenge Scholars Program is designed for students from all majors who are interested in solving important societal problems. The program fosters a vibrant interdisciplinary community to help tackle the National Academy of Engineering's (NAE) Grand Challenges, and gives students experiences and skills to create solutions to some of the most pressing challenges of the 21st century.

Rankings
 

The university is ranked tied for 137th in the 2022-2023 U.S. News & World Report rankings of "National Universities" in the United States, and is ranked tied for 78th nationally among public universities. It was ranked 6th nationally in undergraduate teaching and 6th in innovation. UMBC ranks fourth among U.S. research universities in the production of IT degrees and certificates, according to U.S. Department of Education data. The data shows UMBC ranking #21 in MS, and #31 in PhD IT degree production.

In 2012, U.S. News & World Report rated UMBC as the 12th most under-performing university, citing a gap between academic reputation and performance in the academic indicators.
The Carnegie Foundation classifies UMBC as a research university with high research activity.

UMBC has received a rating of 4 out of 5 from Campus Pride's LGBT-friendly campus climate index.

Partnerships
The university has formed a variety of centers and institutes. It has a partnership with NASA. The Center for Space Science and Technology, Goddard Earth Sciences and Technology Center, and the Joint Center for Earth Systems Technology all are affiliated with the Goddard Space Flight Center in Greenbelt, Maryland, and share collaboration efforts with the University of Maryland, College Park.

In 2014, the university signed agreements with the United States Army Research Laboratory and the United States Army Research, Development and Engineering Command, for research in information systems, computer science, cybersecurity, networks, sensors, communications, mathematics and statistics, human dimensions, human systems integration, synthetic biology, power, quantum information processing, natural language processing and robotics.

USB and the University of Maryland, Baltimore (UMB) jointly operate the Research & Innovation Partnership Seed Grant program, which aims to promote inter-institutional research collaborations between the two USM institutions and to stimulate joint grant proposals to federal agencies and foundations. This shared program allows students and faculty to receive grants for research, increased collaboration, as well as the ability to use the facilities of both universities.

In February 2015, UMBC formed another partnership with Kyushu University in Fukuoka, Japan, for research in computer security.

Furthermore, in the spring of 2015 an array of partnerships between UMBC and the US Navy were announced. The two announced the opening of the first Naval ROTC unit in Maryland, on the campus of UMBC, with the US Navy sponsoring a multitude of four year full-ride scholarships for select candidates. In addition, a cybersecurity research partnership between the two institutions was announced, beginning with five collaborative research projects between UMBC faculty and students and the US Navy.

Sustainability

In 1997, President Freeman Hrabowski created the Conservation and Environmental Research Areas of UMBC also known as CERA on the south end of the campus. The conservation area encompasses 50 acres surrounding Pig Pen Pond and Bwtech@UMBC Research and Technology Park. At the same time as preserving the land, CERA allowed UMBC students to use the land for educational and recreational purposes. CERA contains two parts. The larger tract, covering approximately 45 acres of the south end of the main campus, contains a wide variety of ecological conditions: mature upland forest, early- and mid- successional forest, and riparian and wetland environments. The second, area is much smaller, with an area of about 3 acres. This surrounds Pigpen Pond, which was once actually a pigpen until it filled with water. There are also several areas within CERA where evidence of previous human occupancy and use can be found. In addition to teaching opportunities for faculty, CERA offers a wide range of opportunities for students and faculty to undertake short and long-term research projects in a variety of disciplines. Management of CERA is guided by the need to maintain these landscapes as natural areas to be preserved and protected for approved uses in education, research and wildlife observation.

In 2007, President Freeman Hrabowski signed on to the American College and University President's Climate Commitment (ACUPCC) and formed the Climate Change Task Force. 20% of the university's emissions comes from renewable energy. Additional sustainable efforts include a green roof on Patapsco Hall, and the construction of new LEED certified buildings such as West Hills Community Center and the Performing Arts and Humanities Building. Preservation has also been a growing focus for UMBC, through the creation of CERA, Conservation Environmental Research Area. "No-mow zones" and stormwater retention ponds have also been added to the campus.

In 2013, UMBC earned Tree Campus USA recognition by the Arbor Day Foundation.

In May 2014, UMBC dedicated 11 acres on the northeastern side of the campus for preservation through the Maryland Department of Natural Resources. Also in 2014, the university has opened its first community garden for its students. The garden will give students the chance to grow their own food on campus.

In May 2015, two Prove It! teams went on to win the $10,000 grant for their sustainability driven ideas to improve the life of students. The first, Retriever Treasure, collects unwanted furniture, clothes, and other items from students moving out of dorms and apartments at the end of each school year. They then resell these items at the beginning of the school year to raise funds for other initiatives and donate the remainder of the items not sold. The second, SolarRetrievers, raised an additional $30,000 from UMBC Residential Life, Facilities Management, and The Commons to purchase 4 EnerFusion Solar Power-Dok solar tables. These tables promote the idea of sustainable energy by directly demonstrating how solar panels are used to charge a battery and power devices in areas that normally would not have electricity readily available. The tables are located in the courtyard between Harbor and Chesapeake Hall, The Commons terrace, and two are on the terrace outside of the Retriever Activities Center.

Mascot

The Chesapeake Bay Retriever is the state dog of Maryland and has been the mascot of UMBC since weeks after its founding in 1966. The costumed mascot was alternately known as "Fever the Retriever" in the late 1990s. The university also once had a live mascot, upon whom the True Grit statue is based, named Campus Sam. At the beginning of the 2008 fall semester, a Chesapeake Bay retriever puppy was chosen as a new mascot. He attends many athletic events and an online poll was held on the Retriever Activities Center website to choose his name, which was ultimately decided as "Gritty". The school's dining hall is named True Grits.

True Grit appears in two forms: Both as a statue in front of the Retriever Activities Center of a Chesapeake Bay retriever and as a costumed mascot, an anthropomorphized Chesapeake Bay retriever. The latter can typically be seen in attire of whatever sport he is currently attending; this is most often basketball or lacrosse. As part of an art installation, there are also several smaller True Grit statues placed around campus, all given themed decoration by various student artists.

Student life

The Resident Student Association and Student Events Board provide social programming during all academic semesters at UMBC. Over 220 student-run organizations exist on campus.

LLC (Language Literacy & Culture)
This unique interdisciplinary doctoral program draws upon faculty from disciplines in the humanities and social sciences from eight departments and programs at UMBC: African Studies; American Studies; Education; English; History; Gender and Women's Studies; Modern Languages, Linguistics and Intercultural Communication; and Sociology and Anthropology.

LLC (Living Learning Community)
A living learning community (LLC) is essentially themed housing. A hallway of one of UMBC's residence halls is set aside for students who share a certain academic ground. LLCs are intended to provide residents with social, academic, and career opportunities related to their theme. Many sponsor a one credit course in which students are required to enroll.

UMBC has eight LLCs, listed below.

The Center for Women in Technology
The Center for Women in Technology LLC houses women and men who major in engineering or information technology, with the special intention of providing a community for females in this traditionally male dominated academic area. It offers academic, social, and career opportunities.

Discovery Scholars
The Discovery Scholars LLC helps students of an undecided career path explore possible majors and careers. Participants must enroll in its sponsored one credit course. Discovery Scholars are provided with social excursions, career exploration services, academic advising.

Honors College
The Honors College LLC houses members of UMBC's honors college, providing an environment for socialization outside the classroom. Graduates of the Honors program must earn an "A" or "B" in special honors-level courses in various categories of academic disciplines.  It is located in Susquehanna Hall.

Humanities Floor
The Humanities Floor LLC is composed of students interested in—though not necessarily majoring in—the humanities. It facilitates intelligent discussion and field trips related to the humanities. Residents must attend four sponsored events and assist in planning floor activities. Many of the accepted Humanities Scholars choose to reside on the Humanities Floor LLC. The students who live on the floor find a community of like-minded scholars to study with and join in social activities with.

Intercultural Living Exchange
The Intercultural Living Exchange LLC aims to promote cultural diversity. Residents are mentored by international students and participate in social events centered around cultural items, such as holidays, movies, or cuisine. Students are also expected to maintain at least a 3.5 GPA while earning academic credits during service projects. Students earn academic credit for participating in this LLC. Students can participate in language immersion and live with others who are studying French, Spanish, Korean, or Chinese.

Shriver Living-Learning Center
The Shriver Living-Learning Center LLC is centered around service learning. Students build leadership skills by volunteering three to five hours weekly. They are required to take the LLC's sponsored academic course. Residents also hear presentations from guest speakers and give presentations on their own service experiences. Students are able to earn academic credit for their participation.

Visual and Performing Arts
The Visual and Performing Arts LLC provides students interested in the arts chances to deepen their experience of the arts through learning new skills, holding intelligent discussions, and attending relevant events.

Women Involved in Learning and Leadership
The Women Involved in Learning and Leadership LLC is intended to promote leadership skills in social issues. Residents hear speakers, activists, and organizations involved in social change as well as plan and attend related events. Though not its sole focal points, feminism and gender issues predominate this LLC.

STEM LLC
The STEM LLC is UMBC's tenth and largest LLC, and as of Fall 2016 houses 75 students. The STEM LLC is intended for first and second year students at UMBC majoring in STEM. Residents have access to Peer Mentors that are exclusive to the STEM LLC, resources through the College of Natural and Mathematical Sciences, and different seminars that assist residents with deepening their understanding and knowledge of STEM.

Student Events Board 
The Student Events Board, stylized as (seb), is the major programming organization on campus. They host approximately 150 events a semester that are diverse, fun, and often free. The spring festival on campus, Quadmania, is hosted entirely by (seb).

UMBC holds homecoming in the fall semester during the month of October. Homecoming consists of numerous activities and festivities on campus. Namely, Homecoming includes the 5K Dawg Chase race, and a comedy show. Past performances include Trevor Noah, Jim Gaffigan, B. J. Novak, Nick Offerman, Bo Burnham, and others.

Quadmania serves as the university's student festival during the spring semester. The event takes place during April outdoors, near the center of campus on the Quad or Erickson Field. The headliner for the spring of 2012 was Gym Class Heroes. The headliner for the spring of 2013 was Macklemore & Ryan Lewis and that for the spring of 2014 was Capital Cities.
The 2014 Quadmania was also to have elephant rides, but these were allegedly cancelled due to claims of animal cruelty by some students. In 2015, Kesha  performed at the Retriever Activities Center. In spring of 2016, Fetty Wap headlined Quad Mania on April 24.
In the spring of 2017, T-Pain returned to UMBC and headlined the event.

In October 2019, SEB announced that it would be hosting rappers Megan Thee Stallion and DaBaby on campus.  DaBaby performed on November 14, 2019 in the RAC, and Megan Thee Stallion performed on November 21 in the UC Ballroom.

Greek life
UMBC has 20 officially registered sororities and fraternities with nearly 5% of UMBC's undergraduate students belonging to one of them, as well as one professional fraternal organization. UMBC houses four Greek councils, (NPHC, PHA, MGC, IFC). UMBC is home to 5 PHA organizations, which include Alpha Sigma Alpha, Alpha Sigma Kappa, Delta Phi Epsilon, Phi Mu, and Phi Sigma Sigma. The IFC organizations represented on campus are Lambda Chi Alpha, Pi Kappa Phi, Tau Kappa Epsilon, Phi Kappa Sigma, and Triangle. The NPHC currently houses the organizations Alpha Phi Alpha, Alpha Kappa Alpha, Delta Sigma Theta, Phi Beta Sigma. Their Multicultural Greek Council currently consists of Lambda Theta Alpha, alpha Kappa Delta Phi, Zeta Sigma Chi, Iota Nu Delta, and Lambda Phi Epsilon.

Mock Trial 
UMBC fields an undergraduate mock trial team within the American Mock Trial Association. As of the 2022-2023 season, the University of Maryland, Baltimore County is ranked #9 in the nation. In 2019, UMBC advanced to the National Championship Tournament for the first time in program history, placing eighth in their division. In 2021, UMBC won the American Mock Trial Association (AMTA) National Championship Tournament, defeating Yale University in one of the closest final rounds in AMTA history. In the 2021-2022 season, UMBC again advanced to the National Championship Tournament, but failed to place in their division.

UMBC competitor Syndey Gaskins also competed at Trial by Combat, the one-on-one competition for AMTA competitors hosted by UCLA Law and Drexel Law. As of the 2022 tournament, Gaskins is the only individual to have competed at Trial by Combat three times.

UMBC head coach Benjamin Garmoe hosts the Mock Review, a podcast discussing undergraduate mock trial and associated matters.

Residential life

Campus housing

There are ten housing areas housing approximately 3,900 students, which are: Potomac Hall, Chesapeake Hall, Erickson Hall, Harbor Hall, Patapsco Hall, Susquehanna Hall, Hillside Apartments, Terrace Apartments, Walker Avenue Apartments, West Hill Apartments.

Those building types denoted "Hall" are traditional dormitories with the following typifying characteristics:
 Shared rooms (usually two students per room)
 Shared bathrooms (usually four students per bathroom/two rooms per bathroom)
 Includes basic furniture (bed, desk, chair, closet), Internet access (Ethernet and Wi-Fi) and access to cable television
 Special activities and events every week in the dormitories
 Potomac Hall and the on-campus apartments are open all year, including holiday breaks (called "continuous occupancy").
Most international students prefer Potomac Hall because it is always open. (The other dormitories close during Thanksgiving, winter, and spring breaks.)
 Erickson and Harbor Hall rooms include a living area between the two bedrooms, with the bathroom located in the living area. (living room shared by four students)

Those denoted "Apartments" are distinct in the following ways:
 One student per room
 All avail "continuous occupancy" 9-month housing
 All include a living room

Off-campus housing
Although 71% of first-year undergraduate students are reported to live on campus, UMBC is known as a commuter campus where approximately 65% of the entire student population lives off campus, often in neighboring communities. These students are provided specialized programs and services through the Off Campus Student Services (OCSS) office. Popular locations for students include Catonsville and Arbutus. Popular apartment complexes include the Westland Garden Apartment & Town homes, and the Colony Hill Apartments located 1.5, and 2.5 miles away from campus, respectively. The UMBC Transit lines serves many neighborhoods. Students also live in numerous Baltimore City neighborhoods such as Beechfield, Oaklee, Irvington, Yale Heights, and Edmondson.

Chess

UMBC has won the Pan American Chess Tournament 9 times in 13 years (1996–2009). The school provides substantial chess scholarships to outstanding high school graduate players at the International or Grandmaster level. Former UMBC team captain GM Alexander Onischuk has gone on to become US Champion in 2006. Professor of Computer Science Alan Sherman has been instrumental in building up the UMBC chess dynasty by recruiting players from around the world. UMBC hosts two annual open chess tournaments, the UMBC Open (March) and the UMBC Championship (September).

Athletics

The Maryland–Baltimore County (UMBC) athletic teams are called the Retrievers. The university is a member of the Division I level of the National Collegiate Athletic Association (NCAA), primarily competing in the America East Conference since the 2003–04 academic year. The Retrievers previously competed in the Northeast Conference (NEC) from 1998–99 to 2002–03; and in the Big South Conference from 1992–93 to 1997–98; while they also competed in the Mason–Dixon Conference at the NCAA Division II ranks: the first variation of it from 1972–73 to 1977–78; and the second variation from 1983–84 to 1987–88.

UMBC competes in 17 intercollegiate varsity sports: Men's sports include baseball, basketball, cross country, lacrosse, soccer, swimming & diving and track & field (indoor and outdoor); while women's sports include basketball, cross country, lacrosse, soccer, softball, swimming & diving, track & field (indoor and outdoor) and volleyball.

Quick facts
The school's colors are black and gold. The mascot of the university is the Chesapeake Bay Retriever, the state dog of Maryland, named True Grit. A statue of True Grit stands in front of the Retriever Activities Center (RAC). Their fight song is the UMBC Riser, and was written by Dr. George LaNoue, a professor of policy sciences.

Accomplishments
Until 2017, the UMBC women's volleyball team has participated in the America East tournament every year since 2008. In 2013 the team became a runner-up after losing to University of New Hampshire.

In 2007, UMBC's women's basketball team won the schools first ever women's basketball title. They were invited to the 2007 NCAA tournament where they fought hard against UConn. The UMBC women's basketball team also won the AEC conference title in the 2011–12 season. They were invited to the WNIT where they fell short to the University of Florida.

The Retrievers won their first regular-season American East men's basketball title in 2007–08, and also qualified for their first NCAA Division I men's basketball tournament. They had previously competed in the Division II men's basketball tournament.

In 2009, the men's lacrosse team secured their fifth consecutive outright or shared America East regular season championship and their third America East tournament championship in four years. UMBC has secured a berth in the NCAA tournament each of the past four seasons. In 2007, the unseeded Retrievers upset seventh-seeded Maryland, 13–9, in the NCAA tournament to advance to the Division I second round for the first, and so far only, time in school history.

In 2010, a contest was launched to find a new logo for Athletics. In May 2010, the UMBC Athletic Department unveiled a new logo for the Retrievers created by Jim Lord.

The Retrievers men's swimming and diving program captured its 15th straight conference championship in the 2012–13 season. This streak included every season the UMBC program had competed in the America East, starting with the school's joining the conference in 2003–04 and ending when the America East dropped the sport at the end of the 2012–13 school year. The streak of UMBC conference titles in this sport did not continue in the CCSA.

In March 2016, UMBC announced that their new Men's Basketball coach would be Ryan Odom. Parks Smith criticized the pick, saying that the search firm hired had promoted a candidate more remarkable for his nepotistic ties than for merit.

With the master plan wrapping up in 2018, the school spent $67 million in January 2016 on a new event center completed in Winter 2018. This new event center hosts athletic events such as basketball games, as well as concerts.

The Retrievers’ Men's Basketball team, on March 16, 2018 during the 2018 NCAA men's basketball tournament became the first No. 16 seed in the history of the competition to defeat a No. 1 seed, defeating the Virginia Cavaliers 74–54. They advanced to the Round of 32 for the first time in school history.

Soccer

The Retrievers Men's Soccer Team won the America East Conference in 2010, receiving an automatic bid to the NCAA Division I men's soccer tournament. The Retrievers won their first-round game against Princeton but lost in the second round to William and Mary. Star striker, Levi Houapeu, from the 2010 team was drafted as a 5th pick in the 3rd round of the 2011 MLS SuperDraft by the Philadelphia Union. He is the first UMBC player to be drafted into the MLS. The men also won the conference again in 2012, and advanced to the NCAA tournament once again. They won their first-round game against Old Dominion, but lost in the second round to defending champion, UNC Chapel Hill. In 2013 the Retrievers led the country with an overall record of (16-1-3) and became the first team since 1997 to repeat as America East Conference Champions. They would earn a #16 seed and a first round bye as well as host UMBC's first ever NCAA Tournament match in any sport. The Retrievers would fall in the second round of the tournament to UConn. In 2014, the Retrievers won their third straight America East Conference Championship and advanced the furthest of any UMBC NCAA Division I team by beating the #12-ranked Creighton, as the Retrievers reached the NCAA Men's Soccer Championship semifinals. UMBC is the first team in tournament history to win four consecutive road games and to post shutouts in four consecutive games.

UMBC Women's Soccer Team went 13-5-2 in their 2013 season, tying for the regular-season conference title then winning the conference tournament. This was their first American East Conference title. They then made their first NCAA tournament appearance in 2013, where they lost to #1-ranked VA Tech 2–0 in the first round. This was an amazing accomplishment considering the team had a cumulative record of 3-39-9 in their previous three years.

Notable people

References

External links
 
 Official athletics website

 
Public universities and colleges in Maryland
Educational institutions established in 1966
Baltimore County, Maryland landmarks
Universities and colleges in Baltimore County, Maryland
1966 establishments in Maryland
Baltimore County, University of Maryland